Anoritooq (old spelling: Anoritôq) is a nunatak in Avannaata municipality in northwestern Greenland.

Geography 

Anoritooq is located on the mainland of Greenland in the northern part of Upernavik Archipelago. To the north, Greenland icesheet drains into Sugar Loaf Bay via Cornell Glacier separating it from the base of Nuussuaq Peninsula.

The nunatak has several summits, with the highest reaching . Due to the glacial retreat, another nunatak, Orsugissap Qaqqarsua, culminating in an  summit, is now conjoint with Anoritooq.

References 

Nunataks of Greenland
Sugar Loaf Bay
Upernavik Archipelago